Weltklang is a German electronic music project that was formed in 1980.

Current members are Thomas Voburka and René Steuns.

Background 

Weltklang was formed in the East-German town of Schwerin, German Democratic Republic in 1980.

The mastermind behind Weltklang is Thomas Voburka, who also founded the Berlin based electronic music label Exil-System in 1979.

Weltklang is particularly noted for the innovatively sparse and yet classic Minimal wave track “VEB Heimat”, which was originally released in 1980.

"VEB Heimat" 

Weltklang's first release, the 7” single “VEB Heimat/Hoffnung / Sehnsucht ??” was brought out in 1980.

Inspired by the fast rise of Neue Deutsche Welle and by the Punk subculture's DIY attitude Voburka's main principle was to remove all dispensable ornamentation and polish from his music, and to use the simplest and most minimalist structures. On "VEB Heimat" for instance he made sole use of a simple Roland SH09 Synthesizer line - a very stripped down monophonic analogue synthesizer from Roland Corporation's classic SH-series.

The song itself was based upon a very minimalist, radically filtered bass sequence and a yet destructive, (un)musical arrangement. In addition to this sparse backing, the track featured a furious and repetitive vocal line by Voburka, reiteratively quoting an excerpt from the national anthem of Austria, Land der Berge, Land am Strome.

Whereas the first half of the song title “VEB Heimat” refers to the socialist-tinted expression "Volkseigener Betrieb" (a state owned workplace or establishment in the German Democratic Republic) the second word “Heimat” is a thoroughly and hard to translate German term, comparable to "homeland" in English.

Response 

Not hugely successful at first, the unique and futuristic sounding “VEB Heimat” managed to equal an international cult status over the following years, particularly within the Minimal wave and Minimal Electro music scene.

Today Voburka's Weltklang project is seen as one of the true classics in electronic music and for many DJs and Musicians “VEB Heimat” has grown to an all time favourite.

Weltklang has since then often been referred to by artists such as DJ Hell or Optimo (Espacio). In 2003 for example - 23 years after its original release date - "VEB Heimat" made it into the top 3 of DJs Hell's charts of the year. 
 
Ever since its original release in 1980 “Veb Heimat” has been re-released on numerous occasions, primarily for compilation albums. Apart from its integration in compilation albums such as 80's Minimal Electronics (Volume 1), Return Of Flexi-Pop 3 (Tribute To Flexi-Pop 13) and The Call Of The Banshees, in 2003 "VEB Heimat" was also used as opening track for DJ Hell's hugely successful New Deutsch compilation which was released on International DeeJay Gigolo Records.

In 2018 "VEB Heimat" was chosen by JD Twitch for his German Post Punk Compilation "Kreaturen der Nacht", released on Strut Records and distributed by !K7 Music.

2004 - Present 

On the occasion of Weltklang's 25th anniversary, in 2004 Voburka decided to reform the project, together with London based programmer, producer and engineer René Steuns.

Since then Weltklang have produced various remixes for artists such as Aeronautica, Alter Ego, Asmodeus X, Fall Of Saigon, Kinder Aus Asbest, Mono 45UPM, P1/e, Plastic Japanese Toys, Soldout and Sonnenbrandt as well as the somewhat obscure "Liebesgrüsse aus Ost-Berlin" compilation album. Not only for their original Material but also for their remixes Weltklang remain true to their minimalist and deconstructive DIY approach.

In 2009 the remixes were bundled on the 2x12" "Weltklang - Remixes", released on Exil System.

In 2019 the album "Klášter" and the 12" "Vorwaerts" were released on Exil-System.

Due to the 40th anniversary in 2020, the single sided 4" "Freundschaft" was released on vinylograph.

In 2021 the 12" "Rueckwaerts" and the 2x12" "Vorwaerts/Rueckwaerts" were released on Exil-System.

The 6 Tracks of the 2022 Weltklang album "Weltraum", released on Exil-System, were mainly recorded by Voburka between 1972-1976 and edited by him in 2021. Instruments used on this record are the Arp Odyssey, Moog Sonic Six and the Roland Space Echo.

On Stage 
 
Furthermore from 2005 on Weltklang have played various, sporadic live shows throughout Europe, with critically acclaimed gigs in Belgium, Germany, Sweden and most recently Ukraine.

Discography 

Selected Releases:

Tracks Appear On:

Unofficial Releases:

References

External links
 Official Weltklang Myspace Website
 Exil-System Label Website
 Official Exil-System Myspace Website
 Website of programmer, engineer & producer René Steuns
 Weltklang at Discogs
 Weltklang at Musicbrainz
 Weltklang at Last.fm
 Minimal wave music recommendations
 Youtube video, Weltklang live in Bochum, Germany
 Youtube video, Weltklang live in Gothenburg, Sweden
 Youtube video, Weltklang live in Kiev, Ukraine
 Playlists, Radio WFMU
 Playlists, East Village Radio
 Playlist, Psych Night, Vancouver
 Playlist, Optimo (Espacio), Glasgow
 Playlist, Mark Williams, Washington DC
 Minimal Wave/Neue Deutsche Welle Forum
 Skug https://skug.at/zurueck-im-veb-heimat/

German musical groups